Joan Cererols (9 September 1618 – 27 August 1680) was a Spanish  composer and Benedictine monk.  His musical production includes a Requiem (or Missa pro defunctis) composed in the mid-seventeenth century during the great plague which ravaged Barcelona, and a Missa de Batalla (Battle Mass) which celebrates the conquest of the Kingdom of Naples.

Cererols was born in Martorell. He entered the choir school Escolania de Montserrat around 1626. Cererols took his first steps in music under the direction of Father , a famous organist. After ten years in the escolania, Joan was admitted as a novice at the Monastery of Montserrat on 6 September 1636, at age eighteen. The polychoral dialogue texture with a slight gap between the vocal entries within each choir which lightens his style and contrasts with that of the composers of the earliest generation is supposed to be an influence of March.

In 1648, Cererols received the permission of Marc to visit Madrid where he could meet the new generation of musicians. After his return, he was confirmed as a member of the monastic community. After the death of Marc in 1658, Joan Cererols became choirmaster in his home monastery, a position he held until his death there in 1680. He was 61 years old.

Recordings 
 Joan Cererols: Missa pro Defunctis / Missa de Batalla
La Capella Reial de Catalunya - Jordi Savall, dir. Astrée (Auvidis) E 8704 [CD]- Astrée (Naïve) "Musica Iberica " ES 9924 CD

 Joan Cererols: Missa pro Defunctis / Vespers
Currende - Guillemette Laurens - Erik van Nevel, dir. Accent (Note 1) ACC 94106 CD

References 
Kennedy, Michael (2006), The Oxford Dictionary of Music, 985 pages,  
 Pujol, David (ed.), Joan Cererols – Obres completes. Montserrat: Abadia, 1930-1983

External links

1618 births
1680 deaths
Musicians from Catalonia
Composers from Catalonia
Baroque composers from Catalonia
Benedictine monks
17th-century classical composers
Spanish male classical composers
Spanish classical composers
17th-century male musicians